Crooms is a surname. Notable people with the surname include:

Chris Crooms (born 1969), American football player 
Harold Crooms (born 1979), American stock car racing driver
Joseph N. Crooms (1880-1957), African-American principal and educator

See also
Crooms Academy of Information Technology
Croom (name)